Italia's Next Top Model, season 1 was the first season of the Italian reality television show based on the American program of the same name which was broadcast on Sky Uno, a channel of the Italian subscription television Sky TV. It began airing in December 2007 and ended in February 2008.

The show was hosted by Russian former model and actress Natasha Stefanenko, who equals the role of Tyra Banks as the head of the search in the original series. The other permanent judge was Michael Giannini, art director and talent scout of model agency d’Management. Recurring judges were: photographer Ciro Zizzo, former top model, Gianni Versace's and Giorgio Armani's muse Nadège du Bospertus and noted Italian fashion journalist Giusi Ferré.

The season was won by Gilda Sansone thus receiving a one-year-contract with d’Management Group as well as a spread in Italian fashion magazine Elle.

Episode summaries

Episode 1
First aired December 4, 2007

Once arrived in Milan the contestants meet the host Natasha and the art director of d'Management Michael Giannini. They welcome the girls in the loft that will be their home during the competition. Soon after they announce the first elimination challenge, the girls must improvise a runway show by creating a look with their own outfits and make-up.

In the judging room Natasha introduces the judges among which Danda Santini, editor of Italian Elle. Most of the girls are criticized for their bad or boring walks and wrong looks. Lorena is praised for her walk, although found a bit aggressive. Elga is told to have good basis, Tiziana is noticed for her look despite her insecurity, Alessandra is complimented for regaining composure after tripping.

Francesca L. and Annalisa are in the bottom two for their poor performances and Annalisa is eliminated for choosing an unmodelesque look.

 Bottom two: Annalisa & Francesca L.
Eliminated: Annalisa
Guest judge: Danda Santini, editor of Italian Elle magazine

Episode 2
First aired December 11, 2007

The girls reach the Aldo Coppola hair salon and receive their makeovers. Some are excited, some accept radical changes like Elga and Francesca L., whose hair is cut short, some others make difficulties such as Lorena. Elena shows disrespect to the famous hairstylist by disliking her blonde dye and shouting she does not want to have her hair chopped off because of her classic look.

Subsequently, the contestants face their first photoshoot with photographer and judge Ciro Zizzo. They choose an outfit and make-up reflecting their styles or personalities. Some of them excel, like Tiziana, others find it difficult, like Agnese.

At the judging panel former model Randy Ingerman reprimands many of the girls for being too ordinary. Tiziana wows the judges while Elena is scolded for being rude and unprofessional.

Agnese and Elena are placed in the bottom two and Agnese is eliminated for failing to portray her personality onto her photos and not putting effort into the photoshoot.

Bottom two: Agnese & Elena
Eliminated: Agnese
Guest judges: Randy Ingerman, former model, & Marta Citacov, fashion journalist

Episode 3
First aired December 18, 2007

The twelve remaining girls get a lesson on basic make-up tecniques by Pablo Ardizzone, a make-up expert. Then, they took part in their first reward challenge by testing their make-up skills and showing what they learned. Manuela ends up winning the challenge and picks Francesca B. and Sara to enjoy a dinner out in an elegant restaurant in Milan.

This week the twelve remaining aspiring models must take part in a complicated challenge: they are told that they will be posing in an Adam & Eve themed photoshoot interacting with a professional male model and holding a snake at the same time. Some contestants fulfill the task and manage to handle the snake except for Tiziana, whose fear pushes her to refuse the reptile's presence on set.

The same day the group of girls gets confrontational with Elena for not doing her own duty in keeping the house clean. Elga, Francesca B., Francesca L., Gilda and Tiziana comment about her careless attitude and after Elena's refusal to talk with Francesca B. and Gilda about the issue Elga bursts into a rage. Natasha visits the girls the following day to admonish them for their unmannered behavior and warns them to adopt a more controlled way of acting by pointing out her disappointment and anger with them.

Later on, the girls are evaluated in the judging room, where Tiziana comes up with a good picture despite her fears. Alessandra gets complimented for using her facial structure to her advantage, and so is Elga for softening her look in her picture. Gilda, Francesca B. and Francesca L. are also noticed for interacting with the male model, whereas Manuela and Sara are criticized for not being comfortable on set and showing this on their photos.

After deliberation, Manuela and Sara land in the bottom two, both for not interacting with the elements of the photoshoot, and Sara is sent packing for being too stiff and not being able to use her body.

Bottom two: Manuela & Sara
Eliminated: Sara
Special guest: Pablo Ardizzone, make-up artist

Episode 4
First aired December 25, 2007

The eleven remaining girls get a visit from Alberto Zanoletti, vice-editor of Italian Elle, who puts them through this week's reward challenge by giving each one a small budget to create a hippy look with. The winner turns out to be Elga who is allowed to make a phone call to a loved person, and she decides to share her prize with Francesca L.. The girls are clearly happy to hear their beloved ones after long time of isolation in the models' house.

Later the girls reach the Maison Romeo Gigli, where they will face the elimination challenge. There they meet fashion designer Gentucca Bini who assigns each contestant an outfit that they will walk with while being evaluated.

Once in the judging room, Tiziana, Lorena, and Alessandra received praises for making the most of their outfits and improving their runway walks, but Francesca B. is criticized for her manly walk, and Gilda for still being too sexy. Elena gets scolded for hiding her outfit and misusing her jacket while Francesca L. is reprimanded for walking hastily thus not showing her dress.

Elena and Francesca L. are paired in the bottom two both for disrespecting the product they were supposed to sell and for their dreadful walks. Finally, Francesca L. is sent home for not being able to show improvements on the runway.

Bottom two: Elena & Francesca L.
Eliminated: Francesca L.
Guest judge: Gentucca Bini, fashion designer of Maison Romeo Gigli
Special guest: Alberto Zanoletti, vice-editor of Italian Elle magazine

Episode 5
First aired January 1, 2008

The ten remaining contestants receive a visit from the Italian journalist and fashion expert Cristina Parodi who puts them through a written test to evaluate their knowledge of the fashion world. Francesca B. is the winner and shares the prize with Gilda, so they go to a Roberto Cavalli store and each one can pick an outfit they like.

Then the girls are taken to a 19th-century villa near Milan to participate in an evening fashion show wearing 1930s-inspired dresses. The contestants must walk down a scenographic staircase and this worries some of them. The task proves to be difficult for many.

At panel Fiorella and Lorena are praised and so is Gilda for toning her sexiness down. Francesca B. is criticized for her awkwardness, Alessandra is told to have an embarrassing walk, Elga's performance is a disappointment to the judges and Elena is scolded for her ridiculous expression and bad walk.

Elga and Elena land in the bottom two and Elena is sent packing for still not improving in five weeks despite her potential.

Bottom two: Elena & Elga
Eliminated: Elena
Guest judge: Cristina Parodi, journalist and fashion expert

Episode 6
First aired January 8, 2008

The former top model and show judge Nadège pays a visit to the girls' loft to test their progress in the catwalk with a reward challenge. They must walk on a runway and step on a rotating platform at the end of it without falling or tripping. Elga and Lorena prove to be the best ones but Lorena is chosen as the winner and can get a visit from her mom.

For their photoshoot, this week the contestants are taken to a billiard-hall where they will be photographed almost nude in different positions by Malena Mazza known for her unusual photoshoots. Despite her initial fear of showing her body Laura manages to participate, Tiziana must be coached a lot to get her picture, Gilda succeeds in not being too sexy.

At panel the judges complain about Manuela's total lack of intensity, but the photographer supports the girl. Gilda, Lorena, Elga, Tiziana receive good feedbacks, but Alessandra's awkwardness and Laura's blandness are critiqued.

Laura and Alessandra are in the bottom two and Alessandra is eliminated since the judges feel she has reached her limit of improvement and can not go further in the competition.

Bottom two: Alessandra & Laura 
Eliminated: Alessandra
Guest judge: Malena Mazza, fashion photographer

Episode 7
First aired January 15, 2008

After receiving Natasha's letter which tells the girls to prepare for a jump, the remaining contestants take part in their weekly reward challenge: they will be posing as boxeurs jumping on an elastic carpet while being photographed by Ciro Zizzo. Francesca B. ends up as the winner and can spend an evening out with his boyfriend.

This week the girls will take part in a fake commercial for a perfume where they will be directed by Gaetano Vaudo. Easy gestures become difficult for many while being taped and the challenge proves to be less easy than expected.

At the judging panel Elga is found the most natural, but the majority of the aspiring models is reprimanded for failing in the task, in particular Laura, Lorena and Manuela.

Manuela and Lorena land in the bottom two for their lackluster performances, but it is Manuela who is sent home for producing another disappointing result and not progressing at all.

Bottom two: Lorena & Manuela 
Eliminated: Manuela
Guest judge: Gaetano Vaudo, director

Episode 8
First aired January 22, 2008

The seven remaining contestants pay a visit at Italian Elle offices to meet the magazine's chief fashion director, Benedetta Dell'Orto, who evaluates them in this week's reward challenge, which consists of enhancing a simple outfit with proper accessories in order to represent each girl's assigned look for a happening as follows:

Fiorella is proclaimed the winner and she is sent to Fratelli Rossetti shoe store to choose a pair of elegant shoes as her prize.

For this week's photo shoot the girls must pose next to a vintage car in male and female vintage clothes to show both sides of their personalities. Elga bursts into tears when Ciro, the photographer, criticizes her, while Tiziana shines again.

During the judging session Elga, despite producing a good picture, is scolded for crying unprofessionally, Lorena and Tiziana are praised for creating interaction between their male and female photos. Francesca B. is reprimanded for being awkward and not feminine, while Fiorella is deemed boring.

After deliberation Francesca B. and Fiorella are placed in the bottom two for producing bad photos and Fiorella is eliminated as the judges feel that Francesca B. has more potential.

Bottom two: Fiorella & Francesca B. 
Eliminated: Fiorella
Guest judge: Francesco Martini Coveri, fashion designer
Special guest: Benedetta Dell'Orto, chief fashion editor of Italian Elle magazine

Episode 9
First aired January 29, 2008

The girls receive a makeover adjustment and are sent to a fashion store where they meet the owner and designer Matteo Denti, and Whisky, a Japanese stylist. They teach the contestants how to dress in Harajuku girls' style and subsequently put them to test by asking them to create a Harajuku look using colorful clothes available in the store. Once again, thanks to her fashion knowledge, Francesca B. wins the challenge and chooses Elga to share her prize with, which turns out to be a shopping discount to use in the designer's store and a massage in a spa.

For this week's elimination challenge the six remaining contestants are brought to Carlo Pignatelli's atelier where they will be walking with different ranges of wedding dresses to be evaluated on their ability to interpret the assigned outfit. Each dress represents a certain type of bride:

At the judging panel Elga is highly praised for developing a perfect walk and showing the dress properly, Lorena and Gilda are complimented too. Laura's walk is found a bit overdone, but Tiziana and Francesca B. are reprimanded for their poor performances.

Francesca B. and Tiziana land in the bottom two for their bad walks and Francesca B. is sent packing because the judges feel that her over-confidence prevented her from improving her manly runway walk.

Bottom two: Francesca B. & Tiziana Piergianni
Eliminated: Francesca B.
Guest judge: Carlo Pignatelli, fashion designer
Special guests: Mauro Situra, hairstylist of Aldo Coppola Hair Salon, Matteo Denti, designer and fashion expert, Whisky, Japanese stylist.

Episode 10
First aired February 5, 2008

Michael sends the five remaining contestants to a casting for a snack commercial, there they meet professional models. Elga is the most natural in front of the video camera, Tiziana still shows shyness and does good when not thinking to be taped. Soon after Michael explains that was not a proper challenge but a simple test and invites all the girls to an evening out with him.

The elimination challenge this week is an extreme photoshoot with the renowned photographer Settimio Benedusi. The contestants must pose in a building under construction wearing leather lingerie while holding flamethrowers.

In the judging session Lorena gets compliments for her strong look, Tiziana produces a good picture despite her insecurity, Elga is told to have lucked in her shot.

Gilda and Laura are deemed banal in their shoots, so they are put in the bottom two and in the end Laura is sent home for being too average and not memorable to the judges.

Bottom two: Gilda Sansone & Laura
Eliminated: Laura
Guest judge: Settimio Benedusi, fashion photographer

Episode 11
First aired February 12, 2008

This week Elga and Gilda are fed up with Tiziana's persisting insecurities. Elga tries to shake her, since they are almost at the final decision, but Tiziana avoids talking about herself, so Elga and Gilda decide to give up this discussion stating that Tiziana always uses her insecurities as an excuse. But there is no time for arguing since the contestants must pack their bags and fly to Ibiza.

The reward challenge this week consists of an interview with the models' judge, fashion journalist Giusi Ferré. Lorena handles herself well and wins the prize which consists in a phone call to his boyfriend while the other 3 girls must prepare dinner for her.

The next day in Ibiza the girls visit all the trendy clothing shops and are helped to improve their personal styles by the show stylist Susanna Ausoni. Later on they arrive at a beach surrounded by a lunar landscape where they will pose with bad weather for a swimsuit photo shoot, wearing metallic and colorful bathing suits.

Back in Italy, at panel, the girls are ultimately tested on their runway walks before evaluation. The contestants walk in bathing suits to show the judges their improvements. During deliberation, tensions arise among the judges. Ciro states Elga is not able to pose, but all the others find her shot captivating and interesting. Gilda is highly praised for overcoming her sexiness thus producing a sensual and elegant photo, but Giusi Ferré still finds her a bit rough. Tiziana is criticized for her insecurity but gets praised for being more confident in the photoshoot. Lorena reveals to be not the type of girl for swimsuit photoshoots because of her thin body and facial structure.

After a long deliberation Lorena and Tiziana are paired in the bottom two and, thanks to her constant improvements, Lorena is spared. Tiziana is thus eliminated because the judges feel that, despite having the most potential of all, her self-confidence shown this week was too little too late to keep her in the competition.

Bottom two: Lorena & Tiziana Piergianni
Eliminated: Tiziana Piergianni
Special guest: Susanna Ausoni, stylist and look-maker

Episode 12
First aired February 19, 2008

The three finalists take part in their individual editorial beauty shoots, each one portraying a different mood. All the girls do well, but Lorena goes through a moment of insecurity.

At judging all the girls receive good critiques for their editorial look. After deliberation Natasha calls all them in front of her and congratulates them for their progresses. The first girl called is Gilda, followed by Elga. Lorena is eliminated.

Bottom two: Elga & Lorena
Eliminated: Lorena

After congratulating each other the two friends Gilda and Elga are taken to Roberto Cavalli's where they are prepared for the final runway, there they meet fashion designer Eva Cavalli who will attend the show. Each one walks with three different gowns and are praised by Eva for being elegant and professional.

At the final panel Elga is highly praised for her walk and Gilda for her transformation from sexy ordinary girl into a classy runway model. Following the deliberation about the girls' portfolios, Natasha calls Elga and Gilda back in the room and Gilda is proclaimed the first Italia's Next Top Model thanks to her progresses and her fresh look.

Final two: Elga & Gilda Sansone
Runner-up: Elga
Italia's Next Top Model: Gilda Sansone

Episode 13
First aired February 26, 2008

The episode shows what Gilda is up to after winning the competition. It includes the various photo shoots for the Italian edition of Elle magazine where Gilda will be featured.

Contestants
(ages stated are at start of contest)

Summaries

Call-Out Order

 The contestant was eliminated 
 The contestant won the competition

Episode 1 : Wild And Nude Sexy Body Like A Tribe In Vanuatu

Episode 2 : Fight Underwater Represent Bold And Strong Personality

Episode 3 : Personality Motion Video,Makeover Covershoot

Episode 4 : Innocent Beauty In Traditional Chinese Village In Yunan

Episode 5 : Myanmar's Royal Princess In Upscale Fashion Editorial

Episode 6 : Garbage Campaign In Yamuna River With Glamour Dresses

Episode 7 : Indian Romance With Male Model

Episode 8 : High Fashion Couture In Himalayan Mountains

Episode 9 : Lux Photoshoot With Flower And Lux Television Commercial

Episode 10 : Unexpected Pose To Be Great High-End Fashion Catalogue

Episode 11 : Avant Garde Fashion Exotic With (Bling-Bling,Glow Stick,Black Glitter,Mozaik)

Episode 12 : Top 3 Individual Special Music Video

Episode 14 : Harper's Bazaar High Class Magazine, High Fashion Avant Garden, Beauty Shoot For L'Oréal, Elegant Browsure For Volkswaggen, Black And White Motion Editorial

Challenges guide
Episode 1: Improvised fashion show
Episode 2: Photoshoot representing the girls' styles or personalities
Episode 3: Garden of Eden-inspired photoshoot with a snake and a male model
Episode 4: Runway challenge for Maison Romeo Gigli 
Episode 5: Runway challenge on a staircase with 1930s-inspired gowns
Episode 6: Nude photoshoot in a billiard hall
Episode 7: Mock commercial for a perfume 
Episode 8: Photoshoot in male and female vintage dresses
Episode 9: Runway challengew for Carlo Pignatelli
Episode 10: Photoshoot holding flamethrowers in leather lingerie 
Episode 11: Swimsuits photoshoot in Ibiza
Episode 12: Editorial beauty shots
Episode 12: Final runway show for Roberto Cavalli

References

External links 
  (archive at the Wayback Machine)
 

1
2007 Italian television seasons
2008 Italian television seasons

it:Italia's next top model